Pacific High School is a public high school in Port Orford, Oregon, United States.

Academics
In 2008, 82% of the school's seniors received a high school diploma. Of 34 students, 28 graduated, three dropped out and three received a modified diploma.

References

High schools in Curry County, Oregon
Public high schools in Oregon